Speranza Motors, Ltd is an Egyptian auto manufacturer based in Maadi, Cairo. It is a part of the Daewoo Motor Egypt (DME) which itself belongs to the Aboul Fotouh Group. The factory is located in the 6th of October City.

The company started in the early 1980s as an importer of Japanese cars. The assembly plant started its activities with the SKD manufacturing of Daewoo vehicles in 1998. Since 2006 the company is assembling vehicles of the Chinese brand Chery. The cars are released under the Speranza brand.

References

External links
Speranza Motors website
Aboul Fotouh Group website

Car manufacturers of Egypt
Manufacturing companies based in Cairo
Chery
Companies established in the 1980s
Egyptian brands